XST may refer to:

 Cross-site tracing, a network security vulnerability exploiting the HTTP TRACE method.
 Experimental Survivable Testbed, early versions of F-117 Nighthawk stealth aircraft.